Perserikatan Paguyuban Sepakbola Magelang or PPSM (en: Magelang Football Union Association) is an Indonesian football club based in Magelang, Central Java. They play in the third tier of Indonesia football competition, Liga 3. 

They were established on 15 March 1919 as Indonesische Voetbal Bond Magelang (IVBM). IVBM is one of PSSI founding member clubs, as E.A. Mangindaan participated on PSSI establishment in Societeit Hadiprodjo Yogyakarta on Saturday 19 April 1930.

History

Pre-independence era
Since the founding of Perserikatan, they were named Perhimpunan bola Magelang / Indonesische Voetbal Bond Magelang (IVBM). was founded by Wihardjo along with 4 other clubs, Persatuan Sepakbola Mosvia (Mosvia Football Association), Starmvogels, HKS, and Among Rogo on 15 March 1919.

After PSSI was formed and IVBM became a member, the name IVBM was changed to PPSM. This club became a bond member of PSSI in 1934 along with several clubs such as PSISa Salatiga, VIT Tegal, PSIM Malang, PSTS Tasikmalaya, and PSIS Semarang. Their best achievement at that time was to become the third-place in 1935.

Perserikatan era
In 1975, PPSM Magelang returned to the highest caste competition of Indonesian football which was then named Kerjurnas PSSI (PSSI National Championship). PPSM managed to qualify for the national level after defeating its opponents in the regional qualification round. they joined in Group C with Persipal Palu, Persebaya Surabaya, PSBS Biak and PSL Langkat. Unfortunately they failed to advance to the quarter-finals after four consecutive defeats. Since then, until now they have not been able to return to the highest caste of the national football competition which is now called Liga 1.

Dualisme era
The dualism of football competition occurs in Indonesia, there are two leagues with different operators, PT Liga Indonesia (LI) and PT Liga Prima Indonesia Sportindo (LPIS). Many clubs in Indonesia experience dualism and compete in two different competitions. League dualism occurs at the Indonesia Super League and Divisi Utama. PPSM Magelang was also affected by the dualism of competition, so that there were two PPSM clubs competing in Divisi Utama LPIS and Divisi Utama LI.

PPSM Magelang (LPIS) competed in the 2013 LPIS Divisi Utama and was coached by Siswanto, with players such as Dhika Bayangkara, Luki Nur Hakim, Ade Fermanto and Bangun Permana. PPSM Magelang (LPIS) did not succeed in completing the 2013 LPIS Divisi Utama due to several problems. Finally the team officially withdrew in May 2013.

Supporters 
In their journey through the league, PPSM has 3 groups of supporters who are very fanatical, namely SIMOLODRO MAGELANG, SQUADRA MACAN TIDAR, and GATE 1. All three have always been loyal to guard PPSM both at home game or away game.

References

External links

 
Football clubs in Indonesia
Football clubs in Central Java
1919 establishments in the Dutch East Indies
Association football clubs established in 1919